Pelham Henwood (born 22 May 1946) is a South African cricketer. He played in 79 first-class matches between 1965 and 1980. Henwood, a left-arm spin bowler, played for Natal. He was a member of the mixed team that played against the DH Robins XI when they toured in 1975.

See also
 International cricket in South Africa from 1971 to 1981

References

External links
 

1946 births
Living people
South African cricketers
KwaZulu-Natal cricketers
Free State cricketers
Place of birth missing (living people)